Roger Grant (died 7 April 1724) was an unqualified English quack oculist.

Grant, having lost an eye as a soldier in the German emperor's service, set up as an oculist in Queen Anne's reign in Mouse Alley, Wapping. He was appointed oculist to Anne and to George I, and acquired considerable wealth.

He is satirically referred to us 'putting out eyes with great success' in No. 444 of The Spectator (30 July 1712). A sheet describing his professed cures is in the British Museum Library, and also an Account of a Miraculous Cure of a Young Man in Newington, London, 1709, written to discredit his pretensions. The pamphlet states that Grant was a Baptist preacher, had been a cobbler, and was illiterate.

References

Year of birth missing
1724 deaths
Oculists
18th-century English people